Eulimella variabilis is a species of sea snail, a marine gastropod mollusk in the family Pyramidellidae, the pyrams and their allies.

Description
The shell grows to a length of 6 mm. This is a very variable species.

Distribution
This species occurs in the Atlantic Ocean off Mauritania at depths between 0 m and 62 m.

References

 Dautzenberg P. (1912 ["1913"]) Mission Gruvel sur la cote occidentale d'Afrique (1909-1910). Mollusques marins. Annales de l'Institut Oceanographique de Monaco 5(3): 1-111, pls 1-3. [December 1912]

External links
 To World Register of Marine Species

variabilis
Gastropods described in 1870
Invertebrates of West Africa
Molluscs of the Atlantic Ocean